Alexander Pavlovich Rodzyanko (26 August 1879 – 6 May 1970) was an officer of the Imperial Russian Army during the World War I and lieutenant-general and a corps commander of the White Army during the Russian Civil War. He also competed at the 1912 Summer Olympics.

Biography
Rodzyanko came from an old Ukrainian aristocratic family: his father Pavel Rodzyanko was a major landowner and his uncle Mikhail Rodzianko chaired the State Duma from 1911 to 1917. Aleksandr received his education in the Russian Page Corps military academy and at the Cadre Noir cavalry-school in Saumur in France; he then joined the elite Russian Chevalier Guard regiment. An excellent equestrian sportsman, he also studied for a year at the cavalry school at Pinerolo in Italy under Captain Federico Caprilli, known as "the father of the modern forward seat". After successfully participating in London (1911), winning the King Eduard VII Cup, he competed in the 5th-placed jumping team for Russia at the 1912 Olympic Games in Stockholm. Most of the equestrian information about Rodzyanko was published by a Dutch horse magazine, called the 'Hoefslag' by the secretary of the FEI Max E. Amman.

Promoted Colonel in 1912, he went on to take part in World War I. In 1914 he was sent to the frontline where he briefly served in the 2nd Kuban regiment and the 1st Linear Cossack regiment and headed the 16th Don regiment. He later served at the 8th Army and Chevalier Guard Regiment. From May 1916 he headed the Cavalry Officers School. From June to July 1917 he headed the Garrison of Riga. In October 1917 in Pskov the 17th Cavalry division that he headed was disbanded and he was interned by the Germans.

After the Russian Revolution of 1917 he accompanied Prince Lieven to solicit (unsuccessfully) British help for counter-revolutionaries active in Latvia. In 1918 he lived in Riga and received the German assistance in recruiting the volunteers into the anti-bolshevik units. In 1919 General Nikolay Yudenich appointed Rodzyanko (then commander of the Whites' Northern Corps) as his aide, where he led the counter-offensive actions against the Reds and participated in the unsuccessful advance on Petrograd. Once the Northwestern Army had been pushed back to Narva, Estonia, on 23 November 1919 Yudenich sent him to England to seek financial support for the further anti-bolshevik combat. After his mission proved abortive, he chose not to return to Estonia but settled in the United Kingdom and later in the United States.

His brother Pavel Rodzyanko became an instructor at the Irish cavalry school in Dublin and later emigrated to the United States. Aleksandr Pavlovich Rodzyanko became president of the Chevalier Guards association, wrote memoirs and died in New York City aged 90. He is buried at the Novo-Diveevo cemetery in Nanuet, Rockland County, New York.

Honours and awards
 Order of St. Vladimir, 4th class with Swords (1913)
 Order of St. Anna, 3rd class (1913)
 Order of Saint Stanislaus, 3rd class (1913)
 Order of St. Anna, 4th class (1915)
More than 7 medals

References

Further reading
grwar.ru 
hrono.ru 
 Amman, Max E., De ruiters van de Tsaar, from the Dutch Horse Magazine -De Hoefslag-, 18 December 1969.
 Glahn, Erich, Reitkunst am Scheideweg. Die XVIe Olympischen Reiterspiele in Stockholm 1956, Heideheim, Hoffmann publishers, 1956
 Vieux Sang, Een ruiterlijk ruiterleven, from the Dutch Horse Magazine -De Hoefslag-, 20 juni 1968
 Littauer, Vladimir S. Russian Hussar. London: J.A. Allen & Co. Ltd., 1965.
 Littauer, Vladimir S. Horseman's Progress: The Development of Modern Riding. Princeton: D. Van Nostrand Company, Inc., 1962. (p. 226)
  Steinkraus, William C. "Foreword." The Development of Modern Riding. New York: Macmillan Publishing Company, 1991. (p. xiv)

1879 births
1970 deaths
Equestrians at the 1912 Summer Olympics
Olympic equestrians of Russia
Russian male equestrians
Russian generals
Russian military personnel of World War I
White movement generals
People of the Russian Civil War
Ukrainian nobility
Ukrainian generals
Russian people of Ukrainian descent
Recipients of the Order of St. Vladimir, 4th class
Recipients of the Order of St. Anna, 3rd class
Ukrainian anti-communists
Emigrants from the Russian Empire to the United Kingdom
Emigrants from the Russian Empire to the United States